"Can't Stop Myself From Loving You" was a song written by ex-Easybeats members Harry Vanda & George Young in 1974 and was recorded by Johnny Cave, aka stage act William Shakespeare. It was Shakespeare's first hit in Australia, making the number 2 spot on the Australian charts. The song was largely aimed at the teenybopper market.

Shakespeare's follow up hit "My Little Angel" charted even better for him and made number one in early 1975.

In 1974, in the planning stages for the ABC TV Series Countdown, it was suggested that William Shakespeare host the show. However, this was rejected, with Ian Meldrum becoming a regular contributor instead. A number of guest hosts such as Shirley Strachan, John Paul Young and Daryl Braithwaite compèred the show in its early days on an ad hoc basis.

Charts

Weekly charts

Year-end charts

Cover versions
A cover version of "Can't Stop Myself From Loving You" by the Ottawa band Octavian reached number 65 on the Canadian charts in 1977.

References

1974 songs
William Shakespeare (singer) songs
Songs written by Harry Vanda
Songs written by George Young (rock musician)
Albert Productions singles